Lenka Masná (born 22 April 1985 in Nový Jičín) is a Czech runner who specializes in the 800 metres.

She competed at the 2009 World Championships and the 2010 and 2012 World Indoor Championships and the 2012 Summer Olympics without reaching the final.  After this she broke through to a higher performance level, reaching the final of the 2013 World Championships and the 2014 World Indoor Championships.  In reaching the 2013 World Championships, she set a new personal best of 1:59.56.

Competition record

References

1985 births
Living people
Sportspeople from Nový Jičín
Czech female middle-distance runners
Olympic athletes of the Czech Republic
Athletes (track and field) at the 2012 Summer Olympics